Three ships of the Royal Navy have been named HMS Quorn, all named after the Quorn Hunt.

 , launched in 1916, was a  that served in the First World War and was sold in 1922.
 , launched in 1940, was a  sunk by the Germans in 1944.
 , launched in 1988, was a Hunt-class mine countermeasures vessel.

External links 
 History of HMS Quorn from the Royal Navy

Royal Navy ship names